Luca Lulli (born 22 December 1991) is an Italian footballer who plays as a defensive midfielder for Sambenedettese.

Club career
On 1 July 2019, he signed a 2-year contract with Cavese. On 10 April 2021, the contract was terminated by mutual consent.

On 24 September 2021, he returned to Sambenedettese in Serie D.

References

External links
 
 

1991 births
Living people
Sportspeople from the Province of Teramo
Italian footballers
Association football midfielders
Delfino Pescara 1936 players
U.S. Gavorrano players
Como 1907 players
Catania S.S.D. players
Savona F.B.C. players
A.S. Sambenedettese players
Pordenone Calcio players
Paganese Calcio 1926 players
S.S. Teramo Calcio players
S.S. Arezzo players
Alma Juventus Fano 1906 players
Cavese 1919 players
Serie C players
Footballers from Abruzzo